Robert Waller, also known as "EST", is an American rapper and songwriter who began his music career as a member of Philadelphia Hip-Hop collective Three Times Dope, signed to Arista Records during the late 1980s and early 1990s. Waller is best known for his writing contributions to 2004 Destiny's Child album Destiny Fulfilled, which earned him a Grammy nomination for Best R&B Song at the 48th Annual Grammy Awards in 2006 with "Cater 2 U", as well as working alongside producer Scott Storch on three multi-platinum singles from Beyoncé's 2003 solo breakout album Dangerously in Love.

Songwriting and production credits
Credits are courtesy of Discogs, Tidal, Apple Music, and AllMusic.

Awards and nominations

References 

Living people
African-American songwriters
Year of birth missing (living people)